Fábio Assunção Pinto (born 10 August 1971) is a Brazilian actor.

In 2011, he was nominated for the International Emmy Award for Best Actor for his role in the miniseries Dalva e Herivelto: uma Canção de Amor.

Early life
Born in São Paulo, Brazil. He took piano lessons for two and a half years, after classical guitar, folk, singing and choir in his childhood. When he was only 15 years old, knowing how to play guitar and piano, he even started a band called Delta T, but the dream ended up lacking money and time to practice.

Fábio started university and went to study advertising, until one day he saw an announcement of a theater course at the Fundação das Artes in São Caetano do Sul, which he decided to do. That was the beginning of a brilliant career. A week after taking his resume to Rede Globo and being chosen for a test, he was already recording Meu Bem, Meu Mal, his first soap opera. Subsequently, several other works followed, becoming one of Gilberto Braga's favorite actors.

Personal life
Assunção is a Spiritist. In 2017 after new drug problems, he received support from Rede Globo for treatment of addiction in Argentina. In the same year, he joined the Workers' Party.

Filmography

Television

References

External links 

1971 births
Living people
Male actors from São Paulo
Brazilian people of Portuguese descent
Brazilian male film actors
Brazilian male television actors
Brazilian spiritualists
Workers' Party (Brazil) politicians
20th-century Brazilian male actors
21st-century Brazilian male actors